La Pintada may refer to:
La Pintada, Colombia
La Pintada, Panama
 La Pintada (archaeological site) in Sonora, Mexico